Dennis Lawrence is a footballer.

Dennis Lawrence may also refer to:

Dennis Lawrence (cross-country skier)
Denis Lawrence, see Antonio Cabral

See also